TV1000 Poland was a Polish movie TV channel owned by Modern Times Group, owners of the original TV1000 channels. It was launched on the Cyfrowy Polsat satellite platform on March 5, 2007. On January 16, 2013, TV1000 Poland ceased broadcasting.

Modern Times Group
Defunct television channels in Poland
Television channels and stations established in 2007
Television channels and stations disestablished in 2013